Early Netherlandish Painting, Its Origins and Character, is a 1953 book on art history by Erwin Panofsky, derived from the 1947–48 Charles Eliot Norton Lectures. The book had a wide impact on studies of Renaissance art and Early Netherlandish painting in particular, but also studies in iconography, art history, and intellectual history in general. The book is particularly well-known for its iconographic treatment of Van Eyck's Arnolfini Portrait as a kind of marriage contract, a hypothesis advanced by Panofsky as early as 1934. The book remains influential despite its reliance on black-and-white reproductions of paintings, which led to some errors of analysis.

Early Netherlandish Painting shares its title with the comprehensive, 14-volume survey by Max J. Friedländer, a fact obliquely acknowledged at the beginning of the preface.

References
References

Sources
Panofsky, Erwin. Early Netherlandish Painting, Its Origins and Character. Cambridge: Harvard University Press, 1953.
Reprinted in paperback as a Harper and Row "Icon Edition," 1971.
Holly, Michael Ann. Panofsky and the Foundations of Art History. Ithaca, N.Y.: Cornell University Press, 1984.
Podro, Michael. The Critical Historians of Art. New Haven: Yale University Press, 1982.
Shone, Richard and Stonard, John-Paul, eds. The Books That Shaped Art History: From Gombrich and Greenberg to Alpers and Krauss. London: Thames & Hudson, 2013.

External links
Google Books
Internet Archive (free registration required)

1953 non-fiction books
Art history books
Case studies
Harvard University Press books
Panofsky